The Father's Song is an album by worship artist Matt Redman.

Track listing
 Disc - Total Time 64:43
 "Take The World But Give Me Jesus" – 4:25
 "Light Of The World" – 4:41
 "King Of This Heart" – 5:22
 "Justice And Mercy" – 5:55
 "The Father's Song" – 4:20
 "Nothing Is Too Much" – 3:21
 "You Led Me To The Cross" – 4:49
 "Holy Moment" (Featuring: SONICFLOOd)– 4:35
 "O Sacred King" – 4:21
 "Revelation" – 3:25
 "Thank You For The Blood" – 5:42
 "You Must Increase" – 4:34
 "Let My Words Be Few" – 6:32
 "On And On" – 2:36

Matt Redman albums
2000 albums
Survivor Records albums